Naphthionic acid is an organic compound with the formula C10H6(SO3H)(NH2). It is one of several aminonaphthalenesulfonic acids, derivatives of naphthalene containing both amine and sulfonic acid functional groups. It is a white solid, although commercial samples can appear gray. It is used in the synthesis of azo dyes such as Rocceline (a. k. a. Solid Red A), during which the amino group of the acid (in the form of a salt) is diazotated and then coupled with, in the case mentioned, β-naphthol. It is prepared by treating 1-aminonaphthalene with sulfuric acid.

References

Naphthylamines
Naphthalenesulfonic acids